Michael Brown (born 13 March 1957) is a former English badminton international player and a former national champion.

Biography 
Brown who represented Yorkshire became an English National doubles champion after winning the English National Badminton Championships men's doubles title with Andy Goode in 1990.

In 2007, he won the +40 men's doubles title at the All England Senior Championships partnered with Nitin Panesar.

Achievements

IBF World Grand Prix 
The World Badminton Grand Prix sanctioned by International Badminton Federation (IBF) since 1983.

Mixed doubles

IBF International 
Men's singles

Men's doubles

Mixed doubles

References 

1957 births
Living people
Sportspeople from Yorkshire
English male badminton players